The 2007–08 football season in Belgium, which is the 105th season of competitive football in the country.

Honours

League competitions

Belgian First Division

Belgian Second Division

European Club Results
Note that the Belgian team's score is given first

This season, Gent played in the Intertoto Cup and got eliminated in the final round. Likewise Genk got beaten in the second qualifying round of the Champions League, while Anderlecht got knocked out of that same tournament in the third qualifying round which allowed them to take part in the UEFA Cup together with Standard Liège and Club Brugge. In the UEFA Cup, Anderlecht managed to get the furthest, namely into the last 16.

European qualification for 2008-09 summary

Deaths
Constant Vanden Stock, 93, honorary president, former president and player of Anderlecht died by natural causes on April 19, 2008. He also managed the Belgium national team for ten years, is the father of current Anderlecht president Roger Vanden Stock and has the Anderlecht stadium named after him.
François Sterchele, 26, the forward of Club Brugge died in a single-person car accident on May 8, 2008.
Victor Wégria, 71, former player and trainer of RFC Liège is one of the best players in the history of the club. He was four times top scorer in the Belgian top division (in 1959, 1960, 1961 and 1963) and was capped five times by the Belgium national football team. He died by natural causes on June 6, 2008

See also
 Jupiler League 2007-08
 Belgian Cup 2007-08
 2008 Belgian Super Cup
 Belgian Second Division
 Belgian Third Division A
 Belgian Third Division B

References

 
Belgium
Seasons in Belgian football